SS Sirio was an Italian merchant steamer that had a shipwreck off the eastern Spanish coast on August 4, 1906, causing the deaths of at least 150 Italian and Spanish emigrants bound for Brazil, Uruguay, and Argentina. The shipwreck gained notoriety because the captain, Giuseppe Piccone, abandoned ship at the first opportunity. The wreck had a profound effect on communities in northern Italy and was remembered in popular songs of the era.

Background
Sirio was a 4,141-ton, 5,012-horsepower steamboat built in 1883 in Glasgow and owned by Navigazione Generale Italiana of Genoa. She sailed on the Raggio Line, operated by the Societa Italiana di Transporti Maritimi Raggio & Co. She left Genoa on 2 August and picked up additional passengers in Barcelona, and was en route for Cadiz, carrying eight hundred third-class passengers migrating to Brazil, Uruguay, and Argentina. The captain later stated that there were 645 passengers (570 embarked in Genoa, the rest were picked up in Barcelona) and 127 crew members on board.

Wreck

The ship ran aground on the Punta Hormigas, a reef off Hormigas Island, two and a half miles east of Cape Palos, Cartagena, Spain. According to an eyewitness, the captain of the French steamer Marie Louise, she was "taking a dangerous course" when he saw her stop, her bow lifting. The boilers exploded, and "dead bodies began to float past the French steamer, and those on board could hear the shrieks of the drowning." A boat was launched that saved 29 passengers, while the Marie Louise herself saved another 25. Three hundred passengers, most of them Italian and Spanish, lost their lives.

Among the passengers were a number of Catholic officials. The Bishop of São Paulo, José de Camargo Barros, "went down with the ship while blessing the drowning passengers." The Archbishop of São Pedro, Cláudio Gonçalves Ponce de Leon, survived. Boniface Natter, the first abbot of the rededicated Buckfast Abbey (a Benedictine abbey in England), drowned as well; his fellow traveler, Anscar Vonier, survived and became the next abbot.

A panic broke out on the ship, with people being trampled and others throwing themselves in the sea while knife-fights broke out over the lifeboats. Terrifying scenes of mothers grieving over their drowned children were described. One report claimed that the captain and his officers tried to restore order, but it soon emerged that he had been the first to abandon ship.

Rescue efforts
Local fishermen launched boats to aid in the rescue, but it was reported that some of the rescuers also drowned. The captains of two ships, Joven Miguel and Vicente Llicano (which saved 300 and 200 passengers, respectively), were singled out for their heroism. Survivors were brought ashore and put up in the local poorhouse and a circus building.

Aftermath
The ship broke in two after being grounded for nine days, and "dozens of decomposing corpses were released in the turbulence" including "the body of a very young girl still clutching her toy bucket." While initial reports claimed three hundred had died, improper passenger lists made it difficult to determine the exact number, although some reports estimated that as many as four hundred died. Later accounts put the death toll in excess of one hundred and fifty.

The New York Times reported that Captain Piccone died of "grief" and "a broken heart" in Genoa less than a year after the disaster.

Investigation of the captain's behavior
Newspaper reports quickly accused the captain and his crew of improper behavior. Days after the disaster it became known worldwide that the officers had abandoned ship immediately. The captain departed first, causing a panic among the passengers. It was soon reported, incorrectly, that he had committed suicide by shooting himself. One explanation for the ship's unusual course was given by the Spanish newspaper España Nueva: the ship was alleged to have sailed so close because it "engaged in the clandestine embarkation of Spanish emigrants along the coast," in exchange for "large sums of money." This alleged "illicit traffic" was offered as one explanation for the captain's behavior, which "left much to be desired."

Legacy

The wreck of Sirio had a major impact on the victims' communities. According to sociologist Chiara Bondì, the accident was a "prototypical Italian disaster." The effect on the northern Italian communities from which the emigrants came was profound, and the wreck was remembered in a popular ballad, "Il Sirio", which sings of the Sirio that "sailed away for America, and to its misfortune," "convey[ing] the agony of frantic parents looking for children who had gone under the waves." Another ballad, "Mamma Mia, Dammi Cento Lire", possibly refers to Sirio as well—it tells the story of a young man who asks his mother for 100 lire so he can sail to America, but "out on the ocean wide, / The great ship sank beneath the tide." The Spanish poet Santiago Delgado published a memorial "legend" about the disaster in a collection of eight pieces about the Mar Menor, the lagoon just north of Hormigas Island.

See also
 Captain goes down with the ship
 List of shipwrecks

References

External links

 "Memento de la monja del Sirio" by Santiago Delgado

Maritime incidents in 1906
Ships built on the River Clyde
Shipwrecks in the Mediterranean Sea
1884 ships
History of Cartagena, Spain